The 2019–20 Arizona State Sun Devils men's basketball team represented Arizona State University during the 2019–20 NCAA Division I men's basketball season. The Sun Devils were led by fifth-year head coach Bobby Hurley, and played their home games at Desert Financial Arena in Tempe, Arizona as members of the Pac–12 Conference. They finished the season 20–11, 11–7 in Pac-12 play to finish in a tie for third place. They were set to take on Washington State in the quarterfinals of the Pac-12 tournament. However, the remainder of the tournament, and all other postseason tournaments, were cancelled amid the COVID-19 pandemic.

Previous season
The Sun Devils finished the season 23–11, 12–6 in Pac-12 play to finish for second place. In the Pac-12 tournament, the Sun Devils defeated UCLA in the quarterfinals and lost to Oregon in the semifinals. They received an at-large bid to the NCAA tournament where they defeated St. John's in the First Four, and eventually lost in the first round to Buffalo.

Off-season

Departures

Incoming transfers

2019 recruiting class

Roster

Depth chart

Schedule and results

|-
!colspan=12 style=| Non-conference regular season

|-
!colspan=12 style=|  Pac-12 regular season

|-
!colspan=12 style=| Pac-12 tournament
|- style="background:#bbbbbb"
| style="text-align:center"|March 12, 20209:30 pm, FS1
| style="text-align:center"| (3)
| vs. (11) Washington StateQuarterfinals
| colspan=5 rowspan=1 style="text-align:center"|Cancelled due to the COVID-19 pandemic
| style="text-align:center"|T-Mobile ArenaParadise, NV
|-

References

Arizona State Sun Devils men's basketball seasons
Arizona State
Arizona State Sun Devils men's basketball
Arizona State Sun Devils men's basketball